Taste of Time is a Ugandan television series created and directed by Richard Nondo for Urban TV Uganda. It stars Ejule Paul, Phiona Birungi, Eyangu James as Michael, Brommie Abrahams and Douglas Dubois Sebamala as Andy. The series premiered in 2015 and run for four seasons until its finale in 2018.

Cast

Awards

References

External links
  Taste of Time - Trailer
 

Ugandan drama television series
2015 Ugandan television series debuts
2010s Ugandan television series